Theo Cabango is a Welsh rugby union player who plays as a wing for United Rugby Championship side Cardiff Rugby.

Club career
Cabango was named in the Cardiff academy squad for the 2021–22 season. He made his debut for Cardiff in the first round of the 2021–22 European Rugby Champions Cup against , starting at wing. This was then followed up with a try scoring appearance in the next game against English Champions Harlequins.

Personal life
Theo Cabango is the younger brother of Wales international footballer Ben Cabango.

References

Living people
Welsh rugby union players
Cardiff Rugby players
Rugby union wings
Welsh people of Angolan descent
2001 births
Rugby union players from Cardiff